Jonas Bonnier (born 1963) is a Swedish author who has published 8 novels. His latest work, The Helicopter Heist about the Västberga helicopter robbery, has been sold to 34 territories. It is his first attempt in the suspense novel category. The film- and TV-rights were acquired by Netflix and Jake Gyllenhaal's production company Nine Stories. Bonnier was President of the Bonnier Group from 1 January 2008 until May 2013. He is a member of the Bonnier family.

References

1963 births
Living people
Swedish people of Jewish descent
Swedish magazine publishers (people)
Swedish newspaper publishers (people)
Jonas